Caproni Ca.1 may refer to:

 Caproni Ca.1 (1910), a pioneering biplane of 1910
 Caproni Ca.1 (1914), a bomber of the First World War also designated the Ca.30